Luís Monteiro (born 26 November 1961) is a Portuguese modern pentathlete. He competed at the 1984 Summer Olympics.

References

1961 births
Living people
Portuguese male modern pentathletes
Olympic modern pentathletes of Portugal
Modern pentathletes at the 1984 Summer Olympics